Anytown is a 2009 drama film written and directed by Dave Rodriguez. The film has won three film awards. "Best Picture" at the Charleston International Film Festival, "Excellence in Filmmaking" at the Method Fest Independent Film Festival and "Best Screenplay" at the Long Island International Film Expo. The film was later released under the title American Bully. 
The story revolves around the outcomes of war in Iraq and the effects on an individual.

Cast
Matt O'Leary as Brandon O'Leary 
Marshall Allman as Mike Grossman 
Jonathan Halyalkar as Eric Singh 
Sam Murphy as Bo Aznabev 
Ross Britz as Kyle Castranovo 
Brooke Johnson as Michelle 
Meghan Stansfield as Charlotte 
Paul Ben-Victor as Principal Wheeler 
Natasha Henstridge as Carol Mills
Brendan Aguillard as Young Boy I

Reception 
In his review for Variety, Robert Koehler said that "repping a major improvement for director/co-writer Dave Rodriguez on his previous project, 2006’s Push, the new drama tightens the screws and generates some wrenching tension, some of it apparently influenced by the more grueling films of Michael Haneke."

References

External links
 
 

2009 films
2009 drama films
American drama films
2000s English-language films
2000s American films